This is a list of American law firms by profits per equity partner (PPEP, sometimes reported as profits per partner or PPP) in 2022.

See also
List of largest law firms by profits per partner
List of largest United States-based law firms by head count
List of largest United Kingdom-based law firms by revenue
List of largest Canada-based law firms by revenue
List of largest Europe-based law firms by revenue
List of largest Japan-based law firms by head count
List of largest China-based law firms by revenue

References

US

ko:세계의 로펌
zh:律师事务所列表